Project Wingman is a combat flight action video game developed by Sector D2 and published by Humble Games. It was released on 1 December 2020 on Microsoft Windows and later released on 28 October 2021 on Xbox One. The game features two game modes: campaign and conquest. Campaign mode follows the story of the war set on alternate Earth between the United Cascadian Republic and Pacific Federation through a silent protagonist with the callsign Monarch, a mercenary pilot. Conquest mode has the player conquer Cascadia in a rogue-lite game mode by conquering territories, buying new planes, and recruiting allies.

Gameplay
Project Wingman is a combat flight action game similar to the Ace Combat series in which the player flies a combat plane into battle and destroy enemy targets. The player can choose from a wide selection of planes inspired by real-life combat planes and equip the plane with special weapons. The player can choose to play in first-person or third-person. First-person perspective has the option to play with or without the cockpit view. Virtual reality (VR) and hands on throttle-and-stick (HOTAS) are supported.

The game offers the player two game modes: campaign and conquest. Campaign follows a story in which the mercenary pilot Monarch fights for the Cascadians in their war of independence against the Federation in a future Earth devastated by natural disaster. Conquest provides the player roguelite and strategy gameplay in which the player faces enemy waves, manages resources, and conquer the map.

In campaign mode, the player completes twenty-one missions where the objectives can range from destroying enemy planes, annihilating ground forces and bases, and protecting allies. When the player completes a mission, they receive money which can be spent on buying new planes.

In conquest mode, the player starts out with basic combat planes and must complete 43 missions in a single life. Mission types vary from hunting transport planes to destroying anti-air defenses. All missions end with a fight against an enemy ace squadron. Upon mission completion, the player receives credits and prestige. Credits can be used to hire mercenaries, and prestige can be used to buy new planes. The alert level determines number and type of enemies, and it is raised based on the playtime. If the player dies, the player loses everything except prestige and planes bought before.

The player starts out with trainer variants of the F-4 Phantom II and MiG-21 inspired jets. All planes start with flares and standard missiles and can equip with certain special weapons while more advanced planes offer an AOA (Angle of Attack) module, granting supermaneuverability, in place of flares. Before every mission, the player picks a plane, special weapons, and paint scheme. Smaller planes can equip between one or two special weapons while larger planes can equip between two and three special weapons. Completing missions allow the player to earn in-game currency which can be used to purchase other aircraft.Access to some of the planes require the player to finish specific campaign missions with some of the best planes available only when campaign is finished, The difficulty or scores achieved during missions doesn't matter for unlocking aircraft, aside of being source of money.

Synopsis

Setting
The game takes place in an indeterminate future of an alternate-history Earth afflicted by a worldwide volcanic cataclysm centuries ago that uncovered a valuable geothermal energy resource called "cordium" but also created multiple exclusion zones across the planet. In the year 432 AC (After Calamity), the Pacific Federation, a multinational political union based around Australia, east and southern Asia and the western parts of North America, has control over the cordium deposits across the Ring of Fire. In recent years, however, tensions between member states are rising due to Federation imperialist policies, which have been fueled by the rich cordium deposits of the United Cascadian Republic (a member state located along the Pacific Northwest region of North America). Additionally, the Federation plans to further cement its control over Cascadia to exploit their resources. As a result, Cascadia declares independence from the Federation and starts an armed rebellion. Several private military companies such as the Sicario Mercenary Corps are hired by Cascadia in their war against the Federation.

The player controls the game's silent protagonist with callsign "Monarch", who is a member of the "Hitman" Team of pilots part of the Sicario private military company, hired as mercenaries by the government of Cascadia, which also include two other pilots with callsigns "Diplomat" and "Comic"; and Monarch's weapon systems officer "President". Other members of Sicario include Sicario's primary AWACS operator with callsign "Galaxy" and the company's leader with callsign "Kaiser", who is also a pilot and leader of the "Assassin" Team.

Plot
After finishing their contract with the Creole Republic, the Sicario Mercenary Corps is hired by the Cascadian Republic in the midst of their war of independence against the Pacific Federation. The Federation forces gain the upper hand in the early stages of the war, to the point of capturing the Cascadian capital city of Presidia.

However, Hitman is able to slowly turn the tide of the war in Cascadia's favor, as the Federation begins losing support due to Federal war crimes and their inability to control Cascadia. Hitman Team becomes a rallying point for Cascadian forces because of their immense successes in repelling Federation forces, which earns them the attention of the Federation's elite 'Crimson Team', a fighter squadron of elite peacekeeper pilots. The air war culminates in a massive aerial furball between Federation and Cascadian forces over the Bering Strait; during the battle, Crimson Team is deployed to stop Hitman, but is forced to retreat after Hitman inflicts too many losses, leaving Crimson Team's leader, "Crimson 1", enraged and vowing revenge against Monarch. 

During a subsequent mission to liberate Prospero, Cascadia's main economic hub, the Federation bombards the city with cordium-enriched cruise missiles when Cascadian victory seems imminent. The warheads activate Prospero's rich cordium deposits, causing a massive underground volcanic chain reaction. This destabilizes the Ring of Fire and ravages most of the Pacific Rim in the resulting tectonic event. Having lost communications with allied forces in the chaos, Hitman withdraws but are intercepted by bounty hunters, who reveal that Hitman's true identities have been leaked to the public. Hitman shoots down the bounty hunters and re-establishes communications with Sicario, planning to leave Cascadia behind, but their Cascadian liaison officer offers them an undisclosed "deal" in exchange for their continued support. Sicario accepts the deal and continues to fight.

Sicario assists the Cascadians with eliminating Federal resistance and re-stabilizing the country, and Hitman defeats Crimson Team in a dogfight above a devastated Prospero. During the last major battle of the war to liberate Presidia, both sides of the conflict agree to a ceasefire as Cascadia emerges victorious. However, Crimson 1 suddenly arrives in a hijacked prototype super-fighter, the 'Project Wingman'. Overcome with madness from the war and the loss of his squadron, he detonates several cordium-enriched warheads, devastating the city and incapacitating Hitman Team except for Monarch, whom he challenges to a duel. Crimson 1 is ultimately shot down by Monarch, ending the war as the surviving Federation and Cascadian forces spectate. Hitman, having ejected from their planes, are rescued by Sicario's SAR unit, and the remaining Federation forces fear their summary execution on suspicion of breaking the ceasefire.

After the war, Cascadia honors their "deal" with Sicario. The whereabouts of Hitman Team, including Monarch, are unknown; the Federation declares them wanted criminals for their part in the war, though it is implied that they have assumed new identities as part of the deal. Having suffered irreplaceably high casualties and the immense loss of reputation from using cordium WMDs, the Federation faces multiple insurgent movements from other member states, backed by the now-independent Cascadia (which became a haven for mercenaries) among other foreign powers.

Development
Abi Rahmani started Project Wingman as a portfolio piece in November 2015. In 2017, Project Wingman became a full-time project after receiving an Epic Games Unreal Dev Grant. Fans donated to the game's Kickstarter campaign, raising AU$114,544 and exceeding its goal of AU$35,000. Story mode was confirmed by the development team, but cutscenes were not included due to being outside of the Kickstarter budget. Project Wingman′s release date was originally stated for summer 2020 before it was pushed back to early 2021, but the release date was moved to 1 December 2020, due to development proceeding faster than expected.

The game was announced to come on Xbox Game Pass on 10 August 2021 and Xbox consoles later that year. The game was later ported to Xbox One and the Xbox Windows app, and released on 28 October 2021. On March 28th, 2022, the game also released on the online PC game store GOG.com.

Reception

Project Wingman received "generally favorable reviews" from critics, according to review aggregator Metacritic.

Polygon's Charlie Hall praised the game for its action that can be commonly found in modern first-person shooters. TheGamer's Sean Murray noted the game's improvement on the Ace Combat formula by allowing players to equip multiple weapons and adding a rogue-like conquest mode, but he criticized the game's lack of mission variety due to being "go here, shoot things". Critics have praised the game for its audio and visual feedback.

References

External links
Official Website
Project Wingman Alpha Demo on itch.io

2020 video games
Fiction about aerial warfare
Alternate history video games
Combat flight simulators
Dystopian video games
Humble Games games
Indie video games
Post-apocalyptic video games
Single-player video games
Unreal Engine games
Video games developed in Australia
Virtual reality games
Video games set in North America
Windows games
Xbox One games